Outdoor relief, an obsolete term originating with the Elizabethan Poor Law (1601), was a program of social welfare and poor relief. Assistance was given in the form of money, food, clothing or goods  to alleviate poverty without the requirement that the recipient enter an institution. In contrast, recipients of indoor relief were required to enter an almshouse, orphanage, workhouse or poorhouse. Outdoor relief consisted of hot meals and provision of blankets and things necessary for homeless persons. Outdoor relief was also a feature of the Scottish and Irish poor Law systems.

References

Scottish Poor Laws
Irish Poor Laws
English Poor Laws